Lester L. Faigley is an American literary scholar, currently Robert Adger Law and Thos H. Law Centennial Professor at University of Texas at Austin.

Education

University of Washington, Ph.D. (1976), English.
Miami (Ohio) University, M.A. (1972), English, linguistics. 
North Carolina State University, B.A. (1969).

References

Year of birth missing (living people)
Living people
University of Texas at Austin faculty
American literary historians
University of Washington alumni
North Carolina State University alumni
Miami University alumni